Kool-Aid is an album by Big Audio Dynamite II. It was their first album under this name and with this line-up, which had been changed by band leader Mick Jones in 1990. It was only released in the UK, Europe and Australia.  Several of the songs appeared on the group's next worldwide release, The Globe, albeit in reworked form.  Among them is "Change of Atmosphere", which was reworked into the group's number 1 hit "Rush".

Critical reception
Trouser Press wrote that "with a relatively loose feel and concept, Kool-Aid is Jones' most diverse outing ever, a limited-edition eight-song stopgap offering two acoustic ballads, acid-dance, techno-rock, Kraftwerk samples and even Laurie Anderson-styled poltergeist vocals, as well as a remixed (and retitled) version of "Free," the band's contribution to the Flashback soundtrack."

Track listing

Personnel
Big Audio Dynamite II
 Mick Jones - vocals, guitar
 Nick Hawkins - guitar
 Gary Stonadge - bass guitar
 Chris Kavanagh - drums
Technical
C.J., Dave Mercer, Mike Campbell - engineer
Adam "Flea" Newman - "dynamite"

References

1990 albums
Big Audio Dynamite albums
Columbia Records albums